Paul Syverson is a computer scientist best known for inventing onion routing, a feature of the Tor anonymity network.

In 2012, Foreign Policy magazine named Syverson, and Tor's co-creators Dingledine and  Mathewson, among its Top 100 Global Thinkers "for making the web safe for whistleblowers".

In 2014, Syverson was named a Fellow of the Association for Computing Machinery.

References

American computer scientists
Privacy activists
Living people
Year of birth missing (living people)
Place of birth missing (living people)
Nationality missing